Florian Marinescu can refer to:

 Florian Marinescu (canoeist)
 Florian Marinescu (footballer)